Rugby Union of Russia is the governing body for rugby union in Russia. It was founded in 1936 originally as the Rugby Union of the Soviet Union. The Rugby Union of Russia became affiliated to World Rugby (previously known as the International Rugby Football Board, and still later as the International Rugby Board) in 1990. After the 2022 Russian invasion of Ukraine, World Rugby and Rugby Europe suspended Russia from international and European continental rugby union competition. In addition, the Rugby Union of Russia was suspended from World Rugby and Rugby Europe.

Aims
The Rugby Union of Russia set a goal for the Russian national team to qualify for the 2011 Rugby World Cup in New Zealand, and make their first appearance in the tournament. The team succeeded, qualifying as Europe 2 in Pool C, where one of their opponents was one of the country's main sporting rivals, the United States. Further ahead, they targeted being a top twelve rugby playing nation by 2015, and reaching the quarter finals stage of the 2019 Rugby World Cup in Japan.

See also
Russia national rugby union team
Rugby union in Russia

References

External links
 Official Site 

Rugby union in Russia
Rugby
Rugby union governing bodies in Europe
World Rugby members
Sports organizations established in 1936
1936 establishments in Russia